Ida Lindborg (born 13 June 1994) is a Swedish backstroke, butterfly and freestyle swimmer. 

She competed at the 2016 Summer Olympics in Rio de Janeiro.

References

External links

1994 births
Living people
Swedish female backstroke swimmers
Swedish female butterfly swimmers
Swedish female freestyle swimmers
Olympic swimmers of Sweden
Swimmers at the 2016 Summer Olympics
21st-century Swedish women